The 37th Sandžak Division was a Yugoslav Partisan division formed on 4 March 1944. It was formed from the 3rd Proletarian Sandžak, 4th Sandžak, and 8th Montenegro Brigades which had a total strength of around 2,300 fighters. The division was a part of the 2nd Corps.

References 

Divisions of the Yugoslav Partisans
Military units and formations established in 1944